The following is a list of characters that first appeared in the Network Ten soap opera Neighbours in 2003, by order of first appearance. Ric Pellizzeri took over the role of executive producer from Stanley Walsh, who left the show in November 2002. The 19th season of Neighbours began airing on 20 January 2003 and Pellizzeri's name was added to the credits on 12 May. That same month saw Rhiannon Fish join the cast as Lisa Jeffries. Talent manager Melody Jones arrived in June and Charlie Cassidy followed in July. Oscar Scully, the fifth child of the established Lyn and Joe, was born in August. September saw three introductions; Izzy Hoyland, Detective Alec Skinner and Rocco Cammeniti. Two new members of the Bishop family arrived in October, Liljana and her daughter, Serena. Wendy Stapleton joined the cast as Nina Tucker's mother, Trixie, and Natalie Blair debuted as Carmella Cammeniti. December saw the introduction of Simon Mallory as Chris Cousens.

Lisa Jeffries

Lisa Jeffries, played by Rhiannon Fish, made her first on-screen appearance on 13 May 2003. Lisa was Summer Hoyland's (Marisa Siketa) best friend. Lisa was Fish's first screen role and she joined the cast when she was eleven years old. Lisa was initially supposed to be Australian, but after Fish was cast, the writers made her Canadian. Fish said that she loved playing Lisa and that she "got to do lots of awesome things." She described her character as being "selfish and mean" and said that she enjoyed Lisa turning into a "total bitch." Fish said that people may feel sorry for Lisa and that some scenes showed that it was her mother that had made her into a horrible girl.

Summer Hoyland makes friends with Lisa at primary school, after they both join the girls' soccer team. They try and persuade Jack Scully (Jay Bunyan) to coach them full-time, but he just teaches them some tricks. Jack later decides to take on the role of assistant coach. Lisa joins Summer's family for a trip to the beach and she and Summer go off to look for treasure and the walk onto a nudist beach. Lisa and Summer later join a pony club. When Summer's father, Max (Stephen Lovatt), splits up with Stephanie Scully (Carla Bonner), Lisa begins picking on Summer. She tells her that Max is too old for Steph and the girls fight. Summer tries to apologise, but Lisa tells her that she is no longer invited to her birthday party. During an orientation day at Erinsborough High, Lisa is paired up with Summer's brother, Boyd (Kyal Marsh), who threatens to flush her head down the toilet if she continues to bully Summer. Lisa then reports him to Susan Kennedy (Jackie Woodburne).

At their next soccer game, Lisa and Summer make up when Summer passes the ball to Lisa and she scores the winning goal. Lisa notices that Max is sad and she tells Summer that it was the same with her mother, when her father left her. Lisa and Summer then decide to get their parents together, so they can be sisters. However, Max and Lisa's mother, Andrea (Gail Beker), have nothing in common. When the girls start at Erinsborough High, they are laughed at for having their socks rolled up and they struggle with the large building. Lisa passes a note around her class about Susan's divorce and even after she is caught, she continues writing more nasty notes. Summer refuses to laugh at the jokes. Summer meets a new boyfriend, Caleb Wilson (Joss Kasper), who gives her expensive gifts. Lisa does not believe that Caleb exists, but she is shocked when he turns up at school to meet Summer for lunch. Lisa is then humiliated when she tries to flirt with Caleb and he rejects her. Lisa begins hanging around with her boyfriend and she encourages Summer to smoke. Summer refuses and Lisa calls her a loser, ending their friendship. Summer starts hanging around with Penny Weinberg (Sally Kingsford) and Lisa steals Penny's diary and reads it out to everyone.

Melody Jones

Melody Jones, played by Robyn Arthur, made her first on-screen appearance on 13 June 2003.

Melody is a talent manager whose clients included Robbie D (Khi Robertson) and a boy-band called Roger. Melody approaches Nina Tucker (Delta Goodrem) and asks her to sign with her after seeing her perform at Lou's Place. Nina contacts Melody to arrange a meeting and Melody tells her that she does not need her parents to be involved if she wants to sign up. Melody convinces Lou Carpenter (Tom Oliver) to give Nina a regular singing gig at the pub, so she can showcase her music. Nina agree to sign up, but she has to forge her mother's signature on the forms to keep her out of her work. Melody makes attempts to get Nina into the world of showbiz and she arranges for Nina to go to a movie premiere with Robbie D. Nina tries to pull out because she is dating Jack Scully (Jay Bunyan), but Melody tells her that it could be her big break and she goes. Robbie kisses Nina at the premiere and the moment is captured by a photographer. Melody points out that Nina's profile has been raised and she is taking bookings for interviews and gigs.

After a few months, Melody tells Nina that she has a place on an Asian tour for her with Robbie D. Nina agrees to go, but cannot take Jack with her. Weeks later, Nina is shocked to hear Robbie D singing one of her songs on the radio. She contacts Melody who explains to her that she signed a contract which handed over all of her recording rights. Nina owns up to her mother, Trixie (Wendy Stapleton). Lou points out that the contract is not valid as Nina forged a signature on it.

The following year, Stephanie Scully (Carla Bonner) is looking for a wedding dress and she finds Melody working in a bridal shop. Susan Kennedy (Jackie Woodburne) is surprised and makes a dig about Nina. Melody explains that she had given up managing people because she could not trust anyone. Steph leaves the shop after seeing the prices of the dresses. Melody reinvents herself again as a publisher. Janelle Timmins (Nell Feeney) writes a novel and it gets emailed around the town as part of a joke. Melody sees it and contacts Janelle about publishing the book. Melody meets up with Janelle and tells her that it would need to be longer before it can be published. Only the Timmins family knew that Bree (Sianoa Smit-McPhee) had actually written most of the book. A couple of years later, Melody is back working as a sales assistant in a dress shop. Bridget Parker (Eloise Mignon) and Rachel Kinski (Caitlin Stasey) come in looking for dresses for their school formal. Melody believes that they are going to try everything on without buying anything and the girls leave. Bridget tells her mother and aunt what happened and they take Bridget and Rachel back to the shop. They make several purchases with the help of another assistant who gets the commission instead of Melody.

Charlie Cassidy

Charlie Cassidy, played by Cliff Ellen, made his first on screen appearance on 23 July 2003. Charlie is the brother of Doreen and father to Michael and Lyn.

Ellen said that he enjoyed playing the role of Charlie. He described his character as being "very much in the mould of Cliff Ellen, but with the odd difference thrown in by the writers for good measure, depth?" On Charlie's controversial death storyline, Ellen said that he had no problem with it, but the process was emotional as his wife died during filming.

In the past, Charlie has a brief relationship with Valda Sheergold (Joan Sydney) and she falls pregnant. He then starts seeing another girl, Catherine, and Valda's brother-in-law, Henry O'Rourke (Bud Tingwell), blackmails Charlie into leaving Shelley Bay. Henry and his wife, Connie (Val Jellay) adopt Valda's baby, so she is not a single mother. Valda leaves for England and Charlie and Catherine marry and have a son, Michael (David Paterson). Catherine later dies and Charlie goes back to Shelley Bay and sets up a fishing business.

Years later, Lyn Scully (Janet Andrewartha) learns that Valda and Charlie are her biological parents and she finds Charlie. They arrange to meet, but Charlie becomes ill and is admitted to hospital. Lyn visits him and she learns the truth about Henry adopting her, she finds it hard to forgive Charlie, but she softens when she learns that he is dying. Months later, Charlie comes to visit his grandson, Oscar Scully and he invites Henry down, so they and Lyn can talk.  The following year, Charlie returns to see his granddaughter, Stephanie (Carla Bonner), marry Max Hoyland (Stephen Lovatt).

Charlie makes peace with Valda by giving her a pair of pearl earrings and telling her how much she had always meant to him. On the wedding day, Steph and Max elope and Charlie suddenly proposes to Valda. He tells her that he wants to make up for everything that happened between them and so they marry. During their honeymoon, Charlie and Valda meet up with his sister, Doreen (Anne Phelan). Valda is diagnosed with deep vein thrombosis and has to have bed rest. Charlie realises that he wants to spend his last Christmas with Lyn and Doreen agrees to come with him. Charlie tries to keep the truth about his condition from Lyn, but she sees him having a coughing fit. Charlie is taken to the hospital, but he tells his family that he wants to die at Lyn's home. Charlie's last wish is to go on his boat, Sheergold Scandal. Steph and Doreen take him to the boat, but Charlie becomes too ill before they can get on board. The Scullys bring the boat to Ramsay Street on a trailer and Charlie spends Boxing Day on it. Charlie writes a letter to Valda and while he is chatting to Steph, he tells her that he is ready and he dies. Charlie appears to Steph as vision in a dream when she is to stands trial for allegedly killing him. He tells Steph things will work out as they are meant to.

Oscar Scully

Oscar Scully, played by Ingo Dammer-Smith, is Lyn and Joe Scully's fifth and youngest child. He was born on-screen on 20 August 2003. Dammer-Smith joined the show when he was a couple of weeks old, he is the son of one of the technical crew.

Lyn (Janet Andrewartha) and Joe Scully (Shane Connor) decide to try for another baby and almost give up hope, when Lyn suddenly announces she is pregnant at Susan (Jackie Woodburne) and Karl Kennedy's (Alan Fletcher)'s wedding reception. Lyn does not have an easy pregnancy, as she is injured during a robbery at the Kennedy house and then learns that her aunt, Valda (Joan Sydney), is actually her mother. Joe and Lyn decide to go away for a few days when Lyn passes her due date and there is no sign of the baby. Lyn has terrible stomach pains and Joe rushes her home. Lyn is told that the baby is in a breach position and she would need a caesarean section to deliver it. Lyn does not like this and goes home to try exercises to turn the baby, which is successful. Lyn goes into labour and Oscar is delivered by Dr. Veronica Olenski (Caroline Lloyd). Both Lyn and Joe are surprised that Oscar is a boy, as Karl had told them he was a girl.

Joe is happy to have another son, but Lyn finds it difficult to bond with Oscar. Lyn does not comfort Oscar when he cries and she tells him that she does not know why she does not love him properly. Oscar was baptised and Susan, Valda, Harold Bishop (Ian Smith) and Gino Esposito (Shane McNamara) are his godparents. Harold and Gino compete to be the better godfather. Lyn leaves Oscar in the car while she goes shopping and she is arrested for shoplifting. Karl diagnoses her with post-natal depression. Joe makes Oscar a promise that he will love him enough for both of them until Lyn gets better. Lyn begins to bond well with Oscar and is happy when she realises that he likes The Bold and the Beautiful. Joe tries to wean Oscar off the soap, but he does not succeed. Joe leaves the family to look after his father and brother in Bendigo and his marriage to Lyn breaks down. Oscar gets to visit Joe and he has his older siblings, Jack (Jay Bunyan) and Steph (Carla Bonner) around. When Steph becomes pregnant and suffers from breast cancer, she takes Oscar and disappears. She later admits that she was just keeping him safe. Elle Robinson (Pippa Black) babysits Oscar, but he wanders off by Lassiter's lake and loses his in the water. Ned Parker (Daniel O'Connor) rescues Oscar and becomes his nanny. Following her failed marriage to Paul Robinson (Stefan Dennis), Lyn decides to take Oscar to live in Shelly Bay. She returns to Ramsay Street a few years later without him and she reveals that Oscar is with his father in Bendigo. She goes to visit him, but he does not want to return home with her.

Izzy Hoyland

Isabelle "Izzy" Hoyland, played by Natalie Bassingthwaighte, made her first on-screen appearance on 1 September 2003. Izzy is the daughter of Rosie Hoyland (Maggie Millar) and sister to Max Hoyland (Stephen Lovatt). Holy Soap described Izzy as "conniving", while the Herald Sun said she is "Ramsay St's resident bad girl" and a "trouble-making schemer." Bassingthwaighte said that it is fun playing Izzy and that being bad is "exciting."

Alec Skinner

Alec Skinner, played by Kevin Summers, is a Police Detective. He made his first on-screen appearance on 9 September 2003.

Lyn Scully (Janet Andrewartha) leaves her son, Oscar, in the car at a supermarket and a passer-by calls the police. Alec brings Oscar to Lyn and her husband, Joe (Shane Connor), and he explains that the car was in a different car park and that Lyn committed a serious offence. However, Alec says that no further action will be taken. Lyn later takes something from a shop without paying. Alec takes her to the station and she tells him that she did not realise that she had the item. When Oscar starts crying, Alec tells Lyn that he may need feeding or changing, but she snaps at him and he becomes concerned. Lyn tells him that she does not love Oscar and Alec calls Karl Kennedy (Alan Fletcher) as he believes Lyn is suffering from postnatal depression. He explains that his wife went through the same thing. Alec investigates Charlie Cassidy's (Cliff Ellen) death when a high level of painkillers are found in his system and some pillow fibres are also found. He asks Stephanie Scully (Carla Bonner) why she moved Charlie's pillow after he died and after questioning the rest of the family, he tells her to get a lawyer.

Alec later questions her at the police station. Alec also investigates the murder of Gus Cleary (Ben Barrack). He questions Karl and he and his colleague Joanna Douglas (Matilda White) question Boyd Hoyland (Kyal Marsh) and Sky Mangel (Stephanie McIntosh). Alec tells Boyd that he was seen threatening Gus and when Boyd lies that he and Sky were watching a movie the night Gus was killed, Alec proves that he was not. Alec next investigates David Bishop (Kevin Harrington) for fraud. He and his officers take David's computer for evidence, when they discover that there are irregularities with the Helen Daniels Trust. When Alec's wife, Trish, becomes seriously ill, Alec tries to make sure she receives the best care. Paul Robinson (Stefan Dennis) offers Alec money in exchange for information about the identity of a Lassiter's share holder. Alec accepts, but when Paul tries to bribe him into setting up Janelle Timmins (Nell Feeney), Alec breaks off the deal. Alec goes to see Boyd after he is involved in an accident with Charlotte Stone (Rachel Gordon). Charlotte tells Alec that Boyd kidnapped her and made threats. She also tells him that Boyd was involved in Terrence Chesterton's (Scott Johnson) murder. Boyd, however, tells Alec that Charlotte murdered Terence and that he has a confession on an MP3 player. Alec and his team do not find the MP3 player and he charges Boyd with kidnapping and fraud. Steph finds the MP3 player and Alec arrests Charlotte for murder.

A year later, Alec investigates the murder of Chris Knight (Luke Mitchell). He talks to Bridget Parker (Eloise Mignon) about what happened when she was alone with him and she tells him that she pushed Chris over. Bridget's father, Steve Parker (Steve Bastoni), then confesses to hitting Chris. Alec questions Steve and charges him with murder. When Matt Freedman (Benjamin Mitchell) tries to cover up a hit and run caused by his daughter, Alec arrests him after she confesses and he look at witness statements. The following year, Alec becomes involved with Jill Ramsay's (Perri Cummings) death and the subsequent investigation into Paul Robinson, when he goes on the run. Animal activist Mia Zannis (Alicia Bonnadio) strikes a deal with Alec, whereby she will give him the ring leader of her animal activist group and he will drop any charges against her. Mia tells Alec that Zeke Kinski (Matthew Werkmeister) is the ringleader and he gives her a week to prove it. Mia plants computer files containing plans of a house owned by an animal testing facility's CEO on to Zeke's laptop and she takes him to the house. Alec catches Zeke about to climb through a window and arrests him and Mia. Alec does not find any evidence on Zeke, as he knew about it in advance. He then tells Alec that Mia is the ringleader and he is willing to testify against her.

Rocco Cammeniti

Rocco Cammeniti, played by Robert Forza, made his first screen appearance on 19 September 2003. Rocco is a businessman and the father of Rosetta (Natalie Saleeba) and Carmella Cammeniti. (Natalie Blair) TV Week called Rocco a "scary underworld figure." While Doug Anderson of The Sydney Morning Herald branded him a "preposterous sub-Soprano gangster".

In March 2004, it was revealed that Rocco is having an affair with Sindi Watts (Marisa Warrington). Sindi calls him "Tiny" and does not tell her friends his real name. She later decides to end the relationship and she meets up with Rocco, but he tells her that he does not want her let her go. When Sindi tries again, Rocco tells her that he has left his wife and gives her an engagement ring. At first, Sindi cannot bring herself to tell him that she is in love with someone else, but she manages to end their affair. Rocco is hurt and he decides to have her followed to see why she left him. He is "enraged" when he sees photos of Sindi with Toadfish Rebecchi (Ryan Moloney). Warrington said "It's an understatement to say that Rocco is not happy about Sindi and Toadie. He goes a bit crazy. He thinks Sindi is his whether Sindi wants to be or not!"

Lou Carpenter (Tom Oliver) buys a coffee machine for his pub and he sends Toadfish Rebecchi and Connor O'Neill (Patrick Harvey) to collect it. Toadie and Connor meet Rocco and they become convinced that they had found the Erinsborough Mafia. When the machine does not work properly, Rocco gives Lou a lesson in using it. Months later, Rocco asks Lou to employ his daughter, Carmella (Natalie Blair). Rocco notices Connor looking at his daughter and he threatens him. However, he begins to suspect that Carmella is dating Connor and makes plans to stop it immediately. Rocco runs into Connor and lies to him that he is going to leave for Sicily. The next day, he finds Carmella and Connor together in his sauna and sends Carmella away. Lou calls Rocco when he is having some financial problems and Rocco agrees to lend him some money. Rocco makes it clear that the loan is only short term and that he wants the repayments soon. Rocco begins finds a new mistress in Sindi Watts and he enjoys spoiling and looking after her. He realises that he has strong feelings for her when she tries to call the relationship off. He refuses to give up on her and proposes. Sindi has no choice, but to accept. However, Sindi later admits that she is not in love with Rocco and cannot go through with marrying him.

Rocco gets Lou's car as part payment for his loan and he sends a henchmen to find why Sindi broke up with him. Rocco is furious to see photos of Sindi kissing Toadie and he asks Toadie to join him viewing a potential home. Toadie disappears and Sindi and Stuart Parker (Blair McDonough) know that Rocco has played a part in it. Stuart tries to prove that Rocco is guilty, but cannot find any evidence. Rocco spends his time visiting Toadie, who is actually in a coma in a country hospital. It is revealed that while Rocco's henchman was transporting Toadie to Adelaide to give him a fright, they were involved in an accident, which left Toadie badly injured. Rocco becomes upset and he is comforted by Libby Kennedy (Kym Valentine), who is on her way home to Erinsborough. Libby later tells Sindi and Stuart where she met Rocco. They drive to the hospital and find Rocco leaning over Toadie. Rocco tries to run, but Stuart catches him and he is arrested for his crimes. Three years later, Carmella and her sister, Rosetta (Natalie Saleeba) receive a letter from their father, who claims to be dying. They go to visit him in prison and discover that Rocco was lying. He tells them that he is having trouble with his brother, Raimondo (Jeff Kovski), who is trying to destroy one of the family businesses. He asks the girls to dig up some money, which is buried in a local park, and save the business. Carmella gets the money and rescues the business. Rocco asks Rosetta and her fiancé Frazer Yeats (Ben Lawson) to visit him and after he gives them his blessing, he asks to attend the wedding. A few weeks later, Rocco arrives at the church with a police escort to watch Rosetta marry.

Liljana Bishop

Liljana Bishop, played by Marcella Russo, made her first on-screen appearance on 9 October 2003. Liljana is the wife of David Bishop (Kevin Harrington) and mother to Serena (Lara Sacher) and Luka Dokich(Keelan O'Hehir). Liljana is the first Serbian to reside in Ramsay Street.

Serena Bishop

Serena Bishop, played by Lara Sacher, made her first on-screen appearance on 9 October 2003 with her family. Serena is the daughter of David (Kevin Harrington) and Liljana Bishop (Marcella Russo). Sacher was sixteen when she was cast in the role of Serena. The part was her first professional acting job.

Trixie Tucker

Trixie Tucker, played by singer Wendy Stapleton, is the mother of Nina Tucker. She made her first screen appearance on 20 October 2003. Trixie was introduced as Nina Tucker's (Delta Goodrem) mother and a love interest for Lou Carpenter (Tom Oliver).

Trixie arrives in Erinsborough after being dumped by her double act partner and Nina's father, Nick. Stapleton told Inside Soap, "It's a blow to Trixie's ego and it leaves her vulnerable. Her act is in ruins. She puts on a front, but underneath it all she is completely shattered." Lou Carpenter offers Trixie a solo gig at his pub as he likes her, but she cannot perform in public without Nick, so Nina helps out. Stapleton said that the performance enables Trixie to regain some confidence and she and Nina win the audience over. Stapleton also explained that Nina's relationship with her mother was complicated and there were issues between them. Stapleton and Goodrem did not get much of a chance to explore their characters' relationship, as Goodrem was diagnosed with Hodgkin's lymphoma three weeks into the storyline. The scripts were changed so Nina was not as involved. Stapleton said, "You'll see scenes where we pretend she is upstairs until we got the chance to sort it out properly." Trixie eventually went on to marry Lou.

Stapleton reprised the role in 2016 for a brief guest stint. Trixie meets an unsuspecting Lou for a date. Daniel Kilkelly of Digital Spy commented, "If we're honest, they don't seem to be making too much of an effort as they're only catching up in the cafe, but Trixie is still more than happy to see if there's still a spark between them." The character returned on 25 November 2016.

Trixie is a singer and performer who spent most of her life touring the world with her partner, Nick and their daughter Nina. When Nina's schooling begins to suffer the family spend more time in Erinsborough. Trixie and Nick's relationship ends when he has an affair. Trixie tries to keep her problems from Nina, but when she attends one of her mother's shows, she sees that Trixie has no confidence. Lou Carpenter sees Trixie, and as he was a fan and had a crush on her, he offers her a regular gig performing in his pub. She accepts, but her first performance is almost a disaster, when she forgets notes and lyrics. Nina joins her mother on stage and rescues the show. Lou and Trixie begin spending more time together and when Trixie tells him that she cannot live with Nick anymore, Lou offers to rent Number 22 to her and Nina. Trixie cooks Lou a meal to say thanks and they kiss. When Trixie finds out that Nina has signed a contract with Melody Jones (Robyn Arthur) and forged her signature, she is furious. Lou eventually helps Nina get out of the contract.

Trixie makes it clear that she and Nick are over and she kisses Lou again. Trixie tells him that she and Nick were not legally married and they can go public with their relationship. Lou encourages Trixie to tell Nina that she is an illegitimate child and when she does, Nina refuses to speak to her mother for a while. Trixie then proposes to Lou, who accepts. Trixie gets an offer of the lead in a touring production of Hello Dolly and she asks Lou to invest money in it. Lou and Trixie have a showbiz wedding at Her Majesty's Theatre. Valda Sheergold (Joan Sydney) objects to the wedding and calls Trixie a gold-digger, but she and Lou marry. At the reception, Harold Bishop (Ian Smith) has a stroke and Trixie makes it clear that Harold has ruined her day. Lou cancels their honeymoon to look after Harold and Trixie decides to throw herself into being a housewife. Lou remortgages all of his properties and businesses to raise money to fund the Hello Dolly tour. Trixie is excited and she and Lou hold a press conference to announce the tour and their departure for three months. In Hong Kong, Trixie is shocked when the opening night of the musical is cancelled due to low ticket sales. As Lou is stuck in their hotel due to flu, Trixie lies to him that she performed that night. The next day, she discovers that the entire run of the show had been cancelled. Lou finds out that Trixie lied to him and he decides to go home, as they have no money. Trixie gets a gig in a themed club, but Lou tells her to go back to Erinsborough. Trixie feels that she has failed Lou and she slips away during the night. Months later, she joins Nick and Nina in India.

Twelve years later, Lou asks to meet Trixie in Erinsborough to talk. Trixie insists that she was going to pay Lou back and that she regrets the way she left him. Lou wonders if they there is a chance they could give their relationship another chance. They go to The Waterhole, where Trixie notices Sheila Canning (Colette Mann) watching them and she confronts her. Sheila tells Trixie that Lou is on the rebound from his former wife and Trixie leaves.

The BBC said Trixie's most notable moment was "Walking out on Lou when her show Hello Dolly was a flop."

Carmella Cammeniti

Carmella Cammeniti, played by Natalie Blair, made her first on-screen appearance on 26 November 2003. The character of Carmella was created by the writers, following Delta Goodrem's sudden departure due to illness. Three months worth of scripts were rewritten and Carmella was introduced to fill the void left by Goodrem's character, Nina Tucker. Carmella is the youngest daughter of Rocco and Lucia Cammeniti.

Chris Cousens

Chris Cousens, played by Simon Mallory, made his first on-screen appearance on 2 December 2003. Chris is a "sleazy" photographer who uses his profession to take advantage of vulnerable girls, like Serena Bishop (Lara Sacher). Chris returned in 2005 and spiked the drink of Janae Timmins (Eliza Taylor).

TV Week said that Chris "wreaked havoc on Serena's life" when he first appeared. they described him as an "Erinsborough bad guy." Chris returns in 2005 and meets Janae Timmins (Eliza Taylor-Cotter) at a nightclub. Her boyfriend has left her alone and she gets talking to Chris, who tells her that she should be a model. He buys Janae a drink and when she collapses, she realises that it was spiked.

Serena Bishop sneaks out to a nightclub to see Taj Coppin (Jaime Robbie Reyne) and she is approached by Chris, who asks her to model for him. When Serena discovers that her parents are having financial problems, she decides to take up Chris' offer to earn them some money. She and Sky Mangel (Stephanie McIntosh) go to Chris's studio and he gives her a lot of attention. Sky thinks that Chris is looking for more than just a model, but Serena enjoys his attention. She goes back to the studio alone and Chris touches her to change her position and offers her a dress for her school formal. Chris gains her trust and he asks Serena if she would join him at a hotel. Serena agrees, but at the hotel she begins to feel uncomfortable. Chris offers her drinks, but she decides to leave. Chris chases her, but Serena gets into a taxi. He sends her flowers to apologise. Serena models for Chris again in a swimsuit. Serena's parents, Liljana (Marcella Russo) and David (Kevin Harrington), find the photos and refuse to let Serena see Chris. When he comes into the Coffee Shop, Liljana slaps him. Serena claims that she loves Chris and continues seeing him in secret. On her birthday, Serena goes to see him and he begins to get heavy with her and she becomes uncomfortable. When he leaves the room, Serena notices a webcam and leaves. She tells her parents and they call the police. David breaks into Chris' studio and takes his hard drive. Serena later meets Lana Crawford (Bridget Neval) who tells her that she too met Chris and had been taken in by him.

The following year, Janae Timmins goes to a nightclub with her boyfriend. When he tries to get her to kiss someone else, she storms off and walks into Chris. He asks is she is a model and Janae laughs, but he mentions that he is a photographer and she agrees to have a drink with him. He gets the drinks and spikes Janae's. She starts losing control of her body and Chris offers to take her home and goes to get their coats. Janae calls home and her siblings, Stingray (Ben Nicholas), Dylan (Damien Bodie) and Bree (Sianoa Smit-McPhee), arrive at the club. As Chris tries to get Janae out of the club, Dylan sees him and refuses to believe that he is just giving her a hand. Bree knees Chris in the groin and Dylan takes him outside to beat him up. Janae later reports him to the police.

Others

References

External links
 Neighbours characters and cast at the Internet Movie Database

2003
, Neighbours